A Gun & a Ring is a 2013 Canadian drama film written and directed by Lenin M. Sivam. The film explores the harsh realities faced by different generations of Toronto Sri Lankans. It was nominated for  Golden Goblet Award  at the 16th Shanghai International Film Festival. It was also officially selected for the 37th Montreal World Film Festival (WFF) took place August 22 to September 2, 2013 to present under "Focus on World Cinema".

Plot
The film explores the intertwined stories of seemingly ordinary people over a two-week period in Toronto. A young man, Gnanam, who attributes all his failures to his dark past and tries to confront it once and for all; a passionate detective, John, who questions his integrity and passion after making a fateful call; a depressed gay teenager, Aathi, who blames his father and his ideology for the suicidal death of his lover; a compassionate widower, Sornam, who is too preoccupied with the war back in Sri Lanka to protect his daughter from harm's way; a grieving man, Ariyam, who questions his immigrant life in Canada after the tragic death of his only son; and a brave young war victim, Aby, who arrives at a Canadian airport with the hope of a fresh start only to find that she's been abandoned by her fiancé. The film tries to delve deeper into the harsh realities faced by different generations of immigrants as they try to build a life in the adopted land yet unable to let go of their pasts.  All these characters are indirectly linked through a Gun and a Ring.

Recognitions 
Golden Goblet Award Nominee, Shanghai International Film Festival in June, 2013
Official Selection,  Montreal World Film Festival in August, 2013
Official Selection, Louisville's International Festival of Film in October, 2013
Official Selection, American CineRockom International Film Festival in October, 2013
Best Film Award Nominee, Hamilton Film Festival in November, 2013
Best Film, Best Director and Best Actress Awards, Norway Tamil Film Festival in April, 2014 
Privilege screening,  Chennai Women's International Film Festival in May, 2014
Official Selection, International Film Festival of Colombo in September, 2014
Best Film, Best Director, Best Editor, Best Actor and Best Actress Awards , Chennai Kalakam Awards in October, 2014
Best Film, Best Director, Best Screenplay, Best Editor, Best Actress, Best Villain, Best Composer and Best Child Artist Awards , Canadian Tamil Film Awards in May, 2015

Cast
Jon Berrie as Detective John
Thenuka Kantharajah as Aby
Baskar Mahendran as Gnanam
Mathivasan Seenivasagam as Sornam
Kandasamy Gangatharan as Ariyam
Shelly Antony as Aathi
David Brandon George as George
Sekar Thambirajah as Navam
Arthur Simeon as Abit
Selvajothy Ravindran as Latha
Gobi Thiru as Senthil
Michael Johnson as Detective Peter
Bhavani Somasundaram as Kala
Kiruthika Thusyanthan as Sevanthi
Mayoora Manokararasan as Malar
Thenusha Yogathasan as Meenu
Parthi Puvan as Malar's boyfriend
Kokilan Maheswaran as Raj
Suthan Mahalingam as Alex
Christine Wall as Shelter Manager
Edward Konzelman as Restaurant Manager
Komeswaran Annalingam as Young Gnanam
Nisar Nagalay as Muthupandi
Vijay as Sideman

References

External links 
 

2013 films
2010s Tamil-language films
Films set in Toronto
Canadian drama films
2013 crime thriller films
2013 drama films
2010s Canadian films